Asaba-Asa is a town in Nigeria's Delta State.

References

Towns in Delta State
Geography of Nigeria